Call My Agent! is a French comedy-drama television series that premiered on France 2 on 14 October 2015. The series depicts talent agents at the fictional agency ASK (Agence Samuel Kerr) and their relationships with their actor clients, who are real, mainly French, celebrities playing themselves.

It was initially planned that the show would end after its fourth season in 2020, but in April 2021 it was announced that the show would return with a 90-minute TV film followed by a fifth season. Call My Agent! has been broadcast by ICI ARTV in Canada, RTS Un in Switzerland and is available worldwide on Netflix, except in Austria, Spain, Germany and Portugal.

Overview 
The series follows four agents who jointly take control of a fictional talent agency (ASK) after the death of its founder and head. The agents attempt to manage film production crises arising from their stars' egos, financial and legal difficulties, and other complications, while also maintaining rivalries with one another for power and prestige. Most episodes focus on a single actor, their agent, and the production of a film in which they are starring. The series also depicts the agents' private lives, and how they are affected and often harmed by their busy and stressful professional lives.

Cast and characters

Main
 Camille Cottin as Andréa Martel, partner and agent
 Thibault de Montalembert as Mathias Barneville, partner and agent
 Grégory Montel as Gabriel Sarda, partner and agent
 Liliane Rovère as Arlette Azémar, partner and agent
 Fanny Sidney as Camille Valentini, Andréa's assistant
 Laure Calamy as Noémie Leclerc, Mathias's assistant
 Nicolas Maury as Hervé André-Jezak, Gabriel's assistant
 Stéfi Celma as Sofia Leprince, receptionist and aspiring actor
 Assaad Bouab as Hicham Janowski (season 2–present)

Recurring
 Ophélia Kolb as Colette Brancillon
 Isabelle Candelier as Annick Valentini
 Philippine Leroy-Beaulieu as Catherine Barneville (seasons 1–3)
 François Civil as Hippolyte Rivière (seasons 1–2)
 Jean-Yves Chatelais as François Bréhier (seasons 1–2)
 Gabrielle Forest as Hélène Kerr (seasons 1–2)
 Antoine Croset as Antoine (since season 3)
 Anne Marivin as Élise Formain, StarMédia's artistic agent (season 4)
 Stéphane Freiss as Igor de Serisy, producer (season 4)
 Sarah Suco as Justine, Igor's assistant (season 4)

Supporting

 Dominique Besnehard as Paul Granier
 Arben Bajraktaraj as Gabor Rajevski
 Robert Plagnol as Clément
 Anthony Sonigo as Augustin
 Olivia Côte as Armelle Borzek
 Igor Mendjisky as Stephane Freiss
 Marie Berto as Marie-Sophie Garnier
 Lee Delong as Miranda Jones
 Maud Amour as Mathurine
 Kader Boukhanef as Samir Chouke
 Amelie Etasse as Magali
 Nina Gary as Emma Simonet
 Julie Nicolet as Nathalie
 Alain Rimoux as Samuel Kerr
 Elise Lhomeau as Clémentine
 Éric Naggar as Duplay
 Vladimir Perrin as Jonathan Joubert
 Serge Noël as Michel Marteau
 Agnès Château as Michèle Marteau
 Marc Brunet as Mayor Caillot
 Khereddine Ennasri as Saïd
 Sarah-Megan Allouch-Mainier as Karine
 Lucille O'Flanagan-Le Cam as Linda Gérard

The actors
They appear as themselves, in most cases for a single episode.

Season 1 (2015)Episode 1: Cécile de FranceEpisode 2: Line Renaud & Françoise FabianEpisode 3: Nathalie Baye, Laura Smet, Gilles Lellouche & Zinedine SoualemEpisode 4: Audrey FleurotEpisode 5: Julie Gayet, JoeyStarr & Zinedine SoualemEpisode 6: François Berléand

Season 2 (2017)Episode 1: Michel Drucker, Virginie Efira, Ramzy BediaEpisode 2: Fabrice Luchini & Christophe LambertEpisode 3: Julien Doré, Norman Thavaud & Aymeline ValadeEpisode 4: Isabelle Adjani & Julien DoréEpisode 5: Guy MarchandEpisode 6: Juliette Binoche

Season 3 (2018)Episode 1: Jean DujardinEpisode 2: Monica BellucciEpisode 3: Gérard Lanvin & Guy MarchandEpisode 4: Isabelle HuppertEpisode 5: Béatrice DalleEpisode 6: Jean Dujardin, Monica Bellucci, Gérard Lanvin, Audrey Fleurot, Claude Lelouch, JoeyStarr, Françoise Fabian & Line Renaud

Season 4 (2020)Episode 1: Charlotte Gainsbourg & Mimie MathyEpisode 2: Franck DuboscEpisode 3: José GarciaEpisode 4: Sandrine KiberlainEpisode 5: Sigourney WeaverEpisode 6: Jean Reno

Episodes

Season 1 (2015)

Season 2 (2017)

Season 3 (2018)

Season 4 (2020)

Production

Director
Cédric Klapisch, Lola Doillon and Antoine Garceau directed two episodes of the first season.

Laurent Tirard directed two episodes, Antoine Garceau and Jeanne Herry directed one episode of the second season.

Writers
Dominique Besnehard, Julien Messemackers, Michel Vereecken, Sabrina B. Karine, Anais Carpita, Quoc Dang Tran, Nicolas Mercier, Camille Chamoux, Camille de Castelnau, Cécile Ducrocq, Benjamin Dupas and Eliane Montane wrote the first season.

Producers
Dominique Besnehard, Cédric Klapisch, Michel Feller, Aurelien Larger and Harold Valentin produced the series.

Filming
The first season was filmed from November 2014 to February 2015. The second season was shot from September to December 2016.

Awards and nominations

Adaptations
 A Turkish version was released in 2020 under the name Menajerimi Ara. Gay themes were removed in that version.
 A British version was shot in 2021 and premiered on Amazon Prime in select regions in April 2022 under the title Ten Percent. In the United States, it is on AMC Networkss BBC America, Sundance Now, and AMC+.
Cast in the lead roles are Lee Seo-jin, Kwak Sun-young, Seo Hyun-woo and Joo Hyun-young.
 On 26 August 2021, an Indian adaptation was announced by Netflix, titled Call My Agent: Bollywood.
An Italian adaptation produced by Sky debuted on 20 January 2023, titled Call My Agent - Italia.
 Further adaptations include an Indonesian one by Disney+ Hotstar, one set in the Middle East by MBC, a Filipino adaptation by HBO Go, a Malaysian one by Astro and a Polish one by TVN.

Counterparts

See also
W1A, a similar 2014 British series that satirises the management of the BBC with celebrity cameos

References

External links
 
 
 

2015 French television series debuts
2010s comedy-drama television series
2010s French comedy television series
2010s French drama television series
2010s LGBT-related comedy television series
2010s LGBT-related drama television series
2010s workplace comedy television series
2010s workplace drama television series
2020s comedy-drama television series
2020s French comedy television series
2020s French drama television series
2020s LGBT-related comedy television series
2020s LGBT-related drama television series
2020s workplace comedy television series
France 2
France Télévisions original programming
French comedy-drama television series
French LGBT-related television shows
French-language Netflix original programming
Lesbian-related television shows
Television series about actors
Television shows filmed in Paris
Television shows set in Paris